Carol Adams may refer to:

Carol Adams (actress) (1918–2012), American actress and dancer
Carol Adams (educator) (1948–2007), chief executive of the General Teaching Council for England
Carol J. Adams (born 1951), American vegan feminist theorist and author of books on eco-feminism
Carol Adams (politician) (born 1961), local government representative from Western Australia
Carol Adams (born 1967), American psychologist